P2X purinoceptor 3 is a protein that in humans is encoded by the P2RX3 gene.

The product of this gene belongs to the family of purinoceptors for ATP. This receptor functions as a ligand-gated ion channel and may transduce ATP-evoked nociceptor activation. Mouse studies suggest that this receptor is important for peripheral pain responses, and also participates in pathways controlling urinary bladder volume reflexes, platelet aggregation, macrophage activation, apoptosis and neuronal–glial interactions. It is possible that the development of selective antagonists for this receptor may have a therapeutic potential in pain relief and in the treatment of disorders of urine storage.

Ligands
Antagonists
 BLU-5937
 Gefapixant
 Opiranserin

See also
 P2X purinoreceptor
 Purinergic receptor
 Ligand-gated ion channel
 Nociceptor

References

Further reading

External links 
 

Ion channels